The Îles d'Hyères, also known as Îles d'Or, are a group of four Mediterranean islands off Hyères in the Var department of Southeastern France.

Islands

Porquerolles – , an extension of the Giens peninsula
Port-Cros – , the most mountainous, part of Port-Cros National Park, noted for rare flora and as a bird refuge 
Île du Bagaud – , part of the same national park, and without permitted access
Île du Levant – , mostly for military use, partly a long-established naturist community centered on the privately owned village of Héliopolis

References

 
French Riviera
Mediterranean islands
Landforms of Var (department)
Hyeres
Provence-Alpes-Côte d'Azur region articles needing translation from French Wikipedia